Angelina Vitalyevna Telegina (born 8 March 1992) is a former competitive ice dancer. In February 2012, she teamed up with Otar Japaridze to compete for Georgia. They appeared at three ISU Championships, achieving their best result at the 2013 Europeans in Zagreb, where they qualified for the free dance. Earlier in her career, Telegina competed for Russia with Viktor Adoniev and Valentin Molotov.

Programs 
(with Japaridze)

Competitive highlights

With Japaridze for Georgia

With Molotov for Russia

With Adoniev for Russia

References

External links 

 
 
 

1992 births
Russian female ice dancers
Living people
People from Slavuta
Russian people of Ukrainian descent
Competitors at the 2011 Winter Universiade